In November 1945,  Jackson Pollock and his wife Lee Krasner moved to what is now known as the Pollock-Krasner House and Studio in Springs in the town of East Hampton on Long Island, New York.

History
Pollock and Krasner had visited friends nearby when they found this house for sale in 1945.  The price was $5,000 and Peggy Guggenheim loaned them the $2,000 down payment in exchange for artwork.

At first Pollock used an upstairs bedroom as a studio.  In 1946, after moving the barn to improve the view from the house, Pollock started using that building as his studio.  Krasner began using the bedroom as her studio.  Pollock's brother had given him a large collection of square Masonite baseball game boards, and in 1953,  Pollock used them to cover the floor of the house and studio.  After Pollock's death, Krasner started using the barn as her studio.

After Krasner died, the property was given to the Stony Brook Foundation which is administered by Stony Brook University.  Conservators examined the house and studio. Underneath the Masonite squares, they discovered the original barn floor, covered in stray paint. The foundation schedules tours of the studio and house during the summer.

Part of the property was donated by Krasner to The Nature Conservancy in the 1970s. The surrounding Springs neighborhood is on the National Register of Historic Places.  The house and studio was declared a National Historic Landmark in 1994.

In popular culture
The house and studio were used in the making of the biopic Pollock (2000), starring and directed by Ed Harris.
In addition, the studio was featured in Episode 2 of the BBC series, The Code in 2011.

References

External links

 Official Site
A bloggers visit to the Pollock-Krasner House and Studio

Houses on the National Register of Historic Places in New York (state)
East Hampton (town), New York
Artists' studios in the United States
National Historic Landmarks in New York (state)
Houses completed in 1879
Jackson Pollock
Museums in Suffolk County, New York
Biographical museums in New York (state)
Historic house museums in New York (state)
Art museums and galleries in New York (state)
Houses in Suffolk County, New York
National Register of Historic Places in Suffolk County, New York
Stony Brook University
1879 establishments in New York (state)
Museums devoted to one artist